Czewoja is a Polish coat of arms. It was used by several szlachta families.

History

Blazon

Gallery

See also
 Polish heraldry
 Heraldic family
 List of Polish nobility coats of arms

Bibliography
 Tadeusz Gajl: Herbarz polski od średniowiecza do XX wieku : ponad 4500 herbów szlacheckich 37 tysięcy nazwisk 55 tysięcy rodów. L&L, 2007. .

Polish coats of arms